Tatiana Sheykina or Tatyana Sheykina (born November 14, 1991) is a Russian footballer who plays as a defender for WFC Yenisey Krasnoyarsk at the Russian Women's Football Championship.

Sheykina was in the 23-players squad that represented Russia at the UEFA Women's Euro 2017, although she didn't play any of the team's matches in the competition.

References

External links
 
 
 

1991 births
Living people
Russia women's international footballers
Russian women's footballers
Women's association football defenders
WFC Rossiyanka players
ZFK CSKA Moscow players
Ryazan-VDV players
Russian Women's Football Championship players
UEFA Women's Euro 2017 players